The UNC Wilmington Seahawks men's basketball team represents the University of North Carolina Wilmington. The team plays in the Colonial Athletic Association. The Seahawks have won at least a share of the CAA regular season championship for three consecutive years. They won the CAA tournament and appeared in back-to-back NCAA Tournaments in 2016 and 2017.

History

Conference memberships
1976–1984: Independent
1984–present: Colonial Athletic Association

Season-by-season results

UNC Wilmington began playing Division I NCAA basketball in the 1976–77 season. The above records do not include the years UNC Wilmington played as a junior college (1951–63) or in the NAIA (1963–76).

Postseason results

Division I NCAA tournament results
The Seahawks have appeared in the Division I NCAA tournament six times. Their combined record is 1–6.

NIT results
The Seahawks have appeared in the National Invitation Tournament (NIT) two times. Their combined record is 0–2.

CBI results
The Seahawks have appeared in the College Basketball Invitational (CBI) one time. They were the champions of the 2022 College Basketball Invitational. Their combined record is 4–0.

CIT results
The Seahawks have appeared in the CollegeInsider.com Postseason Tournament (CIT) one time. Their record is 0–1.

Seahawks in the NBA
Brian Rowsom
Matt Fish
Devontae Cacok

Seahawks in international leagues

Adam Smith (born 1992), basketball player for Hapoel Holon in the Israel Basketball Premier League

Former Seahawks as head coaches

Former UNC Wilmington Players
Mark Byington, (1994–1998), Head basketball coach of Georgia Southern (2013–present)
John Calipari, (1978–80), Head basketball coach of UMass (1988–96), NBA New Jersey Nets (1996–99), Memphis (2000–09), Kentucky (2009–current)
Billy Donlon, (1995–99), Head basketball coach of Wright State (2010–2016), UMKC (2019–present)
Todd Lickliter, (1975–76), Head basketball coach of Butler (2001–07), Iowa (2007–10), Marian (2012–2015), Evansville (2020–present)

Former UNC Wilmington Coaches
Brad Brownell, UNC Wilmington Head Coach (2002–2006), Head basketball coach of Wright State (2006–10), Clemson (2010–present)
Kirk Earlywine, UNC Wilmington Asst Coach (2006–07), Head basketball coach of Eastern Washington (2007–2011)
Kevin Eastman, UNC Wilmingtin Head Coach (1990–94), Head basketball coach of Washington State (1994–99), NBA Boston Celtics Asst Coach (2004–2005)
Frank Haith, UNC Wilmington Asst Coach (1990–92), Head basketball coach of Miami (FL) (2004–2011), Missouri (2011–2014), Tulsa  (2014–present)
Dave Hanners, UNC Wilmington Asst Coach (1986–89), NBA Asst Coach Philadelphia 76ers (2000–03), Asst Detroit Pistons (2003–05), Asst New York Knicks (2005–06), Asst Charlotte Bobcats (2008–2010), Asst New Orleans Pelicans, (2010–2015)
Kevin Keatts, UNC Wilmington Head Coach (2014–17), Head basketball coach of NC State (2017–present)
Jeff Reynolds, UNC Wilmington Asst Coach (1990–94), Head basketball coach of Wingate (1997–2000), US Air Force Academy (2007–2012)
Byron Samuels, UNC Wilmington Asst Coach (1992–94), Head basketball coach of Hampton (1995–97), Radford (2002–2007), Florida A&M (2014–2017)
Rodney Terry, UNC Wilmington Asst Coach (1998-2002), Head basketball coach of Fresno State (2011-2018), UTEP (2018–current)
Jerry Wainwright, UNC Wilmington Head Coach (1994–2002), Head basketball coach of Richmond (2002–05), DePaul (2005–2010)

References